This is a list of prominent and notable writers from Africa. It includes poets, novelists, children's writers, essayists, and scholars, listed by country.

Algeria
See: List of Algerian writers

Angola
See: List of Angolan writers

Benin
See: List of Beninese writers

Botswana

 Galesiti Baruti, novelist and academic
 Unity Dow (1959–), judge, human rights activist, writer and minister of basic education
 Bessie Head (1937–1986), novelist and short-story writer born in South Africa 
 Leetile Disang Raditladi (1910–1971), playwright and poet
 Barolong Seboni (1957–), poet and academic

Burkina Faso
See: List of Burkinabé writers

Burundi

 Esther Kamatari (1951–)
 Ketty Nivyabandi (1978–)

Cameroon
See: List of Cameroonian writers

Cape Verde

Central African Republic

 Pierre Makombo Bamboté (1932–), novelist and poet
 Etienne Goyémidé (1942–1997), novelist, poet and short story writer: Le Silence de la Foret
 Blaise N'Djehoya (1953–), novelist
 Cyriaque Robert Yavoucko (1953–), novelist

Chad

 Salma Khalil Alio (1982–), poet, short story writer and artist.
 Khayar Oumar Deffalah (c. 1944–), politician and autobiographical writer
 Ali Abdel-Rhamane Haggar (1960–), economist and writer
 Marie-Christine Koundja (1957–), novelist and diplomat
 Koulsy Lamko (1959–), playwright, poet, novelist and university lecturer
 Joseph Brahim Seid (1927–1980), writer and politician
 Ahmat Taboye, literary critic

Congo (Brazzaville)
See: List of Republic of the Congo writers

Congo (Democratic Republic) – formerly Zaïre
See: List of Democratic Republic of the Congo writers

Côte d'Ivoire
See: List of Ivorian writers

Djibouti

 Waberi Abdourahman (1965–), novelist, poet and academic
 Mouna-Hodan Ahmed (1972–), French-language novelist

Egypt
See: List of Egyptian writers

Equatorial Guinea

 María Nsué Angüe (1945–2017), novelist and writer
 Justo Bolekia Boleká (1954–), professor and Bubi writer
 Juan Balboa Boneke (1938–2014), politician and writer
 Raquel Ilombé (1938–1992), Spanish-language writer
 Juan Tomás Ávila Laurel (1966–), Annobonese writer
 Donato Ndongo-Bidyogo (1950–), writer and journalist

Eritrea

 Hamid Barole Abdu (1953–), non-fiction
 Reesom Haile (2003–), Tigrinya-language poet
 Saba Kidane (1978–), Tigrinya poet
 Hannah Pool (1974–), journalist
 Alemseged Tesfai (1944–), English-language playwright

Ethiopia

 Sahle Selassie (c. 1795–1847)
 Haddis Alemayehu (1910–2003)
 Michael Daniel Ambatchew (1967–2012)
 Āfawarq Gabra Iyasus (1868–1947)
 Tsegaye Gabre-Medhin (1936–2006)
 Moges Kebede
 Tāddasa Lībān
 Tsehay Melaku
 Dinaw Mengestu (1978–)
 Maaza Mengiste (1974–)
 Nega Mezlekia (1958–)
 Martha Nasibù (1931–2020)
 Lemn Sissay (1967–)
 Hama Tuma (1949–)
 Mammo Wudneh (1931–2012)
 Birhānu Zarīhun (1933/4–1987)

Gabon

 Jean-Baptiste Abessolo (1932–), educator and short story writer
 Peggy Lucie Auleley, born French-language poet
 Bessora (1968–, in Belgium), novelist and short story writer
 Charline Effah (1977–), French-language novelist and educator
 Rene Maran, born near Martinique (1887–1960), poet and novelist
 Chantal Magalie Mbazoo-Kassa, French-language poet and novelist
 Justine Mintsa (1967–), French-language novelist
 Nadège Noëlle Ango Obiang (1973–), French-language short story writer
 Nadia Origo (1977–), novelist and publisher
 Honorine Ngou (1957–), novelist and academic
 Vincent de Paul Nyonda (1918–1995), playwright
 Maurice Okoumba-Nkoghe (1954–), poet and teacher
 Laurent Owondo (1948–), playwright
 Angèle Ntyugwetondo Rawiri (1954–2010), novelist

The Gambia

Ghana
See: List of Ghanaian writers

Guinea
See: List of Guinean writers

Guinea-Bissau

 Amílcar Cabral (1924–1973), agronomist, writer and politician
 Vasco Cabral (1926–2005)
 José Carlos Schwarz (1949–1977), poet and musician
 Fausto Duarte (1903–1953), from Cape Verde
 Carlos Lopes (1960–)
 Hélder Proença (died 2009)
 Carlos Semedo, poet
 Abdulai Silla (1958–)

Kenya
See: List of Kenyan writers

Lesotho

 David Cranmer Theko Bereng (1900–1974), Sotho poet
 Caroline Ntseliseng Khaketla (1918–2012) 
 Simon Majara (1924–), Sotho novelist
 Zakea D. Mangoaela (1883–1963), folklorist
 Thomas Mofolo (1876–1948), novelist
 A. S. Mopeli-Paulus (1913–1960), novelist
 Edward Motsamai (1870–1959), politician and writer
 Kem Edward Ntsane (1920–), Sotho poet and novelist
 Basildon Peta (1972–), journalist
 Everitt Lechesa Segoete (1858–1923), religious and social writer
 Azariele M. Sekese (1849–1930), Basotho author and historian
 Joseph I. F. Tjokosela (c.1911–), Catholic writer and teacher

Liberia

 Edwin Barclay (1882–1955), politician and writer
 Thomas E. Besolow (c.1867–?), autobiographical writer
 Edward Wilmot Blyden (1832–1912), born in the Virgin Islands (see also Sierra Leone), educator, writer, diplomat and politician
 Roland Tombekai Dempster (1910–1965), poet
 Hawa Jande Golakai (1979–)
 Bai T. Moore (1916–1988), poet, novelist, folklorist and essayist 
 Wilton G. S. Sankawulo (1937–2009), politician and author
 Vamba Sherif (1973–)

Libya

 Sadiq Al-Nayhum (1937–1994), Islamic writer, critic and journalist
 Khalifa al-Fakhri, short story writer
 Ahmed Fagih (1942–2019), novelist
 Muammar al-Gaddafi (1942–2011), politician and occasional novelist
 Ibrahiem El-kouni (1948–), novelist
 Latifa al-Zayyat (1923–1996), activist and novelist

Madagascar
See: List of Malagasy writers

Malawi
 Tito Banda (1950–2014), novelist, academic
 Ezra Jofiya Chadza (1923–1985), poet and novelist
 William Chafulumira (1908–1981), writer on social issues
 Yesaya Chibambo, author of A Short History of the Ngoni (1933), translated into English by Rev. Charles Stuart.
 Shadreck Chikoti (b. 1979), writer and social activist
 Steve Chimombo (1945–2015), writer, poet, editor and teacher
 Frank Chipasula (b. 1949), poet, writer, editor, publisher and academic
 Reuben Chirambo (d. 2011), scholar of African literature
 Robert Chiwamba, poet
 Tobias Dossi, author of a novel (1958) and humorous short stories (1965) in Chichewa.
 Aloysius Dziko, author of a novel in Chichewa (1965).
 Walije Gondwe (b. 1936), Malawi's first female novelist
 John Gwengwe, author of novels in Chichewa (1965, 1968).
 Aubrey Kachingwe (b. 1926), novelist and short story writer
 Lawrence Kadzitche, short story writer
 Samson Kambalu (b. 1975), artist and autobiographer
 William Kamkwamba (b. 1987), inventor and author
 Gertrude Webster Kamkwatira (1966–2006), playwright
 Whyghtone Kamthunzi (1956–2000), novelist in Chichewa
 Legson Kayira (1942–2012), novelist and autobiographer
 Stanley Onjezani Kenani (b. 1976), writer and poet
 Ken Lipenga (b. 1954), politician, journalist and writer
 John Lwanda (b. 1949), biographer, poet, doctor, publisher
 Qabaniso Malewezi (b. 1979), spoken-word poet
 Benedicto Wokomaatani Malunga (b. 1962), poet and broadcaster
 Jack Mapanje (b. 1944), writer and poet
 Emily Mkamanga (b. 1949), novelist and social commentator
 Felix Mnthali (b. 1933), poet, novelist and playwright
 Francis Moto (b. 1952), writer, academic, and diplomat
 Sam Mpasu (b. 1945), novelist and politician; author of prison memoirs
 Edison Mpina (1946–2001), poet
 Ndongolera Mwangupili (b. 1977), poet and short story writer
 George Mwase (c.1885–1962), author of a historical account of the 1915 rebellion, published 1967 (2nd ed. 1970).
 Anthony Nazombe (1955–2004), poet and academic
 Innocent Masina Nkhonyo (b. 1987), short story writer and poet
 Jolly Max Ntaba (1946–1993), novelist in Chichewa and English
 Samuel Josia Ntara or Nthara (1905–1979), novelist and historian
 D.D. Phiri (Desmond Dudwa Phiri), economist, historian and playwright
 Bonwell Kadyankena Rodgers (b. 1991), author, translator and editor 
 David Rubadiri (1930–2018), diplomat, academic and poet
 Paul Tiyambe Zeleza (b. 1955), historian, critic and writer
 Barnaba Zingani (b. 1958), novelist in Chichewa and English, teacher.
 Willie Zingani (b. 1954), novelist in English and Chichewa, journalist, poet, playwright
 Tendai M Shaba (b. 1989), author, writer and poet 

See: List of Malawian writers

Mali
See: List of Malian writers

Mauritania

 Ahmad ibn al-Amin al-Shinqiti (1872–1913), Arabic-language writer
 Amadou Oumar Bâ (1917–), poet
 Ibn Razqa (died 1144 AH/1731 AD), poet and scholar
 Moussa Diagana (1946–2018), French-language writer
 Moussa Ould Ebnou (1956–), French-language novelist
 Abderrahmane Sissako (1961–), filmmaker

Mauritius

Morocco

Mozambique
See: List of Mozambican writers

Namibia

 Neshani Andreas (1964–2011), novelist
 Ndeutala Angolo (1952–), novelist and nonfiction writer
 Joseph Diescho (1955–), novelist 
 Dorian Haarhoff (1944–), poet and academic
 Giselher Werner Hoffmann (1958–), German-language novelist
 Anoeschka von Meck (1967–), journalist and Afrikaans-language writer
 Hans Daniel Namuhuja (1924–1998), poet
 Cosmo Pieterse (1930–), playwright and poet living and working in South Africa

Niger
See: List of Nigerien writers

Nigeria
See: List of Nigerian writers

Rwanda
See: List of Rwandan writers

São Tomé and Príncipe

 Olinda Beja (1946–), novelist
 Sara Pinto Coelho (1913–1990), fiction writer and playwright
 Caetano da Costa Alegre (1864–1890), Portuguese-language poet
 Mário Domingues (1899–1977), novelist
 Conceição Lima (1962–), Portuguese-language poet
 Manuela Margarido (1925–2007), Portuguese-language poet
 Alda do Espírito Santo (1926–2010), Portuguese-language poet 
 José Francisco Tenreiro (1921–1963), literary critic and poet

Senegal
See: List of Senegalese writers

Seychelles

 Antoine Abel (1934–2004), poet and fable writer

Sierra Leone
See: List of Sierra Leonean writers

Somalia

 Abdi Sheik Abdi (1942–), U.S.-based writer
 Mohamed Diriye Abdullahi, linguist and translator
 Maxamed Daahir Afrax, novelist, playwright and critic
 Elmi Boodhari (1908–1940) poet
 Ayaan Hirsi Ali (1969–), feminist and anti-Islam activist
 Ahmed Ibrahim Artan, diplomat, author and politician
 Jaamac Cumar Ciise (c.1922–2014), historian of Somali oral literature
 Waris Dirie (1965–), model and autobiographical writer
 Salaan Carrabey (1864–1943) poet 
 Cristina Ali Farah (1973–), poet and novelist
 Farah Nur ((1862–1932)) poet and warrior
 Hussein Hasan (d. 1910s) warrior and poet
 Nuruddin Farah (1945–), novelist
 Hadrawi (1943–), poet
 Yaasiin Cismaan Keenadiid (1919–1988), literary scholar
 Abdi Kusow, scholar and writer
 Abdillahi Suldaan Mohammed Timacade (1920–1973) poet
 Nadifa Mohamed (1981–), novelist
 Gaariye (d. 2012) poet
 Mohamed Haji Mukhtar (1947–), historian and scholar
 Rageh Omaar (1967–), journalist
 Abdi Ismail Samatar (1950–), geographer
 Ahmed Ismail Samatar (1950–), writer and academic
 Said S. Samatar (1943–), scholar and writer
 Cali Xuseen Xirsi (1946–2005), poet
 Shadya Yasin (1983/4–), poet

South Africa
See: List of South African writers

Sudan
See: List of Sudanese writers

Swaziland

 Modison Salayedvwa Magagula (1958–), playwright
 Stanley Musa N. Matsebula (1958–), economist and writer
 Elias Adam Bateng Mkhonta (1954–2001), novelist
 Sarah Mkhonza (1957–), novelist, short story writer and journalist
 Gladys Lomafu Pato (1930–), short story writer

Tanzania
See: List of Tanzanian writers

Togo
See: List of Togolese writers

Tunisia
See: List of Tunisian writers

Uganda
See: List of Ugandan writers

Western Sahara

 Mohamed Fadel Ismail Ould Es-Sweyih (1958–2002), journalist and politician
 Ahmed Baba Miské (1935–2016), writer, diplomat and politician

Zambia

 Ellen Banda-Aaku (1965–), fiction, children's books
 Jack Avon (1967–), non-fiction, business books
 Kenneth Kaunda (1924–2021), nationalist and writer
 Chibamba Kanyama (1965–), journalist and business writer
 Andreya Sylvester Masiye (1922–), diplomat and novelist
 Dominic Mulaisho (1933–2014), novelist 
 Charles Mwewa, poet and non-fiction writer
 Princess Zindaba Nyirenda, novelist
 Field Ruwe (1955–), educator, historian, media practitioner, author (fiction and non-fiction)
 Namwali Serpell (1980–), fiction
 Monde Sifuniso (1944–), editor, publisher, author (fiction and non-fiction)
 Binwell Sinyangwe (1956–)

Zimbabwe
See: List of Zimbabwean writers

See also

 African Writers Series
 Lists of authors
 International Research Confederacy on African Literature and Culture
 List of Latin American writers

Notes

References

External links
 25 African Women Writers
 Contemporary African writers/authors
 Africa Resource research data
 Lire les femmes – African women writers

 
+African